Revanta Sarabhai (born 2 September 1984) is an Indian film and theatre actor, dancer, and choreographer from Ahmedabad, Gujarat, India. He is known for being one of the few male Bharatanatyam soloists of his generation.

Early life 
He is the son of dancer turned activist Mallika Sarabhai and publisher Bipin Shah; and grandson of the Indian physicist Vikram Sarabhai and dancer Mrinalini Sarabhai.

Sarabhai got his basic dance training from his grandmother Mrinalini Sarabhai and had his solo classical dance début at age eight.  He started touring with the Darpana Performing Group in his early teens, starting in 1999 and also got training in a variety of folk, contemporary and martial arts forms from India and abroad.

Education and career 
Sarabhai has a bachelor's degree in fine arts from The University of the Arts, Philadelphia, and a master's degree in performance & creative research from the University of Roehampton, London and worked as an independent dancer and choreographer in Europe before moving to India in 2014. He headed the arts education and training activities at the Darpana Academy of Performing Arts in Ahmedabad from 2014 to 2017, and continues to be an internationally touring performer and choreographer.

Sarabhai has collaborated with several international dancers and choreographers and has been an associate choreographer at Korzo, Den Haag since 2012.

In 2017, Sarabhai made his feature film debut with the Gujarati film Dhantya Open, co-starring Kiran Kumar, Naresh Kanodia, and Manav Gohil. He has since acted in four other Gujarati feature films, including O! Taareee (2017), Mijaaj (2018), Paaghadi (2018) and Mara Pappa Superhero (2021). In 2018, Sarabhai made his television debut as a host on the Gujarati dance reality show Naach Maari Saathe on Colors Gujarati channel.

In 2021, Sarabhai featured in an episode of the web series Cutting on Oho Gujarati.

Filmography

Television Series

References

External links
Revanta Sarabhai Official Website
Europalia International
Tehelka Magazine
Korzo Theatre - Resident Choreographer Profile
Revanta Sarabhai on IMDB
Times of India – Revanta Sarabhai talks about being a TV host

Indian male dancers
Artists from Ahmedabad
Living people
1984 births
Dancers from Gujarat
Indian male film actors
Sarabhai family